Justice Root may refer to:

Jesse Root (1736–1822), chief justice of the Connecticut Supreme Court
Jesse L. Root (1860–1947), associate justice of the Nebraska Supreme Court
Milo A. Root (1863–1917), associate justice of the Washington Supreme Court